The 1946 Central Intercollegiate Conference football season was the season of college football played by the six member schools of the Central Intercollegiate Conference (CIC) as part of the 1946 college football season. 

The Southwestern Moundbuilders compiled an 8–2 record and won the CIC championship, . 

None of the CIC teams was ranked in the Associated Press poll or played in a bowl game.

Conference overview

Teams

Southwestern

The 1946 Southwestern Moundbuilders football team was an American football team that represented Southwestern College as a member of the Central Intercollegiate Conference (CIC) during the 1946 college football season. In their first season under head coach Art Kahler, the team compiled an 8–2 record (4–1 against CIC opponents) and won the CIC championship.

Washburn

The 1946 Washburn Ichabods football team was an American football team that represented Washburn University of Topeka, Kansas, as a member of the Central Intercollegiate Conference (CIC) during the 1946 college football season. In their first season under head coach Dick Godlove, the team compiled an 6–2–1 record (3–1–1 against CIC opponents) and finished in second place in the CIC.

St. Benedict's

The 1946 St. Benedict's Ravens football team was an American football team that represented St. Benedict's College (later renamed Benedictine College) of Atchison, Kansas, as a member of the Central Intercollegiate Conference (CIC) during the 1946 college football season. In their sixth season under head coach Marty Peters, the team compiled a 4–3–1 record (2–2–1 against CIC opponents), finished in third place in the CIC, and outscored opponents by a total of 107 to 99.

In the fall of 1946, St. Benedict's had the largest enrollment in its then 87-year history, with enrollment estimated at 425 students, an increase of over 100% over the prior year.

Pittsburg State

The 1946 Pittsburg State Gorillas football team was an American football team that represented Pittsburg State University of Pittsburg, Kansas, as a member of the Central Intercollegiate Conference (CIC) during the 1946 college football season. In their tenth season under head coach Charles Morgan, the team compiled a 2–4–2 record (1–2–2 against CIC opponents), finished in fourth place in the CIC, and outscored opponents by a total of 72 to 46.

Fort Hays State

The 1946 Fort Hays State Tigers football team was an American football team that represented Fort Hays State University of Hays, Kansas, as a member of the Central Intercollegiate Conference (CIC) during the 1946 college football season. In their first season under head coach Ralph Huffman, the team compiled a 2–4–2 record (1–4 against CIC opponents), tied for last place in the CIC, and was outscored by a total of 102 to 80.

Emporia State

The 1946 Emporia State Hornets football team was an American football team that represented Emporia State University of Emporia, Kansas, as a member of the Central Intercollegiate Conference (CIC) during the 1946 college football season. In their 16th season under head coach Fran Welch, the team compiled a 4–5 record (1–4 against CIC opponents), tied for last place in the CIC, and outscored opponents by a total of 72 to 46.

References